The 2012 Úrvalsdeild (also known as the "Pepsi-deild" for sponsorship reasons) is the 101st season of top-tier football in Iceland. The season began on 6 May 2012 and concluded 29 September 2012. The league was won by FH, the club's sixth Icelandic league title, while defending champions KR finished as runners-up, some 13 points behind FH. At the other end of the table, Grindavík and Selfoss ended the campaign in the bottom two and were thereby relegated to the 2013 1. deild karla.

Teams
A total of twelve teams will contest the league, including ten sides from the 2011 season and two promoted teams from the 1. deild karla.

Þór Akureyri and Víkingur R. were relegated from 2011 Úrvalsdeild after finishing the season in the bottom two places of the league table. Both teams were relegated having just achieved promotion the season before.

2011 1. deild karla champions ÍA Akranes and runners-up Selfoss secured direct promotion to the Úrvalsdeild. ÍA returned to the Úrvalsdeild after a three-year absence while Selfoss return immediately to the top league after a one-year absence.

League table

Positions by round

Results
Each team play every opponent once home and away for a total of 22 matches.

Top goalscorers

Source ksi.is

References

External links
 Official website 
 Football-Lineups 

Úrvalsdeild karla (football) seasons
1
Iceland
Iceland